Bumbești-Jiu is a town in Gorj County, Oltenia, Romania, on the river Jiu. It administers four villages: Curtișoara, Lăzărești, Pleșa and Tetila. It officially became a town in 1989, as a result of the Romanian rural systematization program.

The town features the Lainici Monastery, the Vișina Monastery (built in 1418), and a "Village Museum".

Natives
 Dorin Arcanu
 Corina Peptan
 Dan Vîlceanu

References

Towns in Romania
Populated places in Gorj County
Localities in Oltenia
Monotowns in Romania